Willy and the Poor Boys is the fourth studio album by American rock band Creedence Clearwater Revival, released by Fantasy Records in November 1969.  It was the last of three studio albums the band released that year, arriving just three months after Green River.

Overview 

The album features the songs "Down on the Corner", from which the album got its name, and "Fortunate Son", which is a well-known protest song. Creedence also released its own version of "Cotton Fields" on this album, which reached the #1 position in Mexico.

The album was planned to be formed around a concept introduced in "Down on the Corner", with Creedence taking on the identity of an old-time jug band called "Willy and The Poor Boys".  However, this was dropped rather quickly, except for the cover, where the band remains in character.

Background
By the fall of 1969, Creedence Clearwater Revival was one of the hottest rock bands in the world, having scored three consecutive #2 singles and the #1 album Green River. In addition, the group had performed at the landmark Woodstock Festival in August and made several high-profile television appearances, including The Ed Sullivan Show. Bandleader and songwriter John Fogerty had assumed control of the band after several years of futility, but, despite their growing success, the other members – bassist Stu Cook, drummer Doug Clifford and guitarist Tom Fogerty, John's older brother – began to chafe under Fogerty's demanding, autocratic leadership. The band's output in 1969 alone – three full-length albums – was staggering considering that they were touring nonstop throughout. "That was a bit of overkill and I never did understand that," Clifford stated to Jeb Wright of Goldmine in 2013, "Fogerty told us that if we were ever off the charts, then we would be forgotten... To make it worse, it might sound funny, but we had double-sided hits, and that was kind of a curse, as we were burning through material twice as fast.  If we'd spread it out, we would not have had to put out three albums in one year." The fiercely competitive Fogerty remained unapologetic, insisting to Guitar World'''s Harold Steinblatt in 1998, "Everyone advised me against putting out great B-sides. They'd tell me I was wasting potential hits. And I looked at them and said, 'Baloney. Look at the Beatles. Look at Elvis. It's the quickest way to show them all that good music."

Songs
In August, CCR released its third LP, Green River. Shortly after, it began recording songs for its next LP, Willy and the Poor Boys. Two months later the band released its eighth single, "Down on the Corner" b/w "Fortunate Son". The single's A-side reached #3 on the Billboard Hot 100 and its B-side made it to #14. "Down on the Corner" chronicles the tale of the fictional band Willy and the Poor Boys, and how they play on street corners to cheer people up and ask for nickels. The song makes reference to a washboard, a kazoo, a Kalamazoo Guitar, and a gut bass. In a 1969 appearance on The Ed Sullivan Show, the boys performed the song as Willy and the Poor Boys. Stu Cook played a gut bass, Doug Clifford the washboard, and Tom Fogerty the Kalamazoo, which mimicked the appearance of the band as they appear on the album cover.

"Down on the Corner" b/w "Fortunate Son" peaked at #3 on December 20, 1969, on the Hot 100.  "Fortunate Son" is a counterculture era anti-war anthem, criticizing militant patriotic behavior and those who support the use of military force without having to pay the costs themselves (either financially or by serving in a wartime military). The song, released during the Vietnam War, is not explicit in its criticism of that war in particular, but its attacks on the elite classes (the families that give birth to eponymous "fortunate sons") of the United States and their withdrawal from the costs of nationalistic imperialism are easy to contextualize to that conflict. The song was inspired by the wedding of David Eisenhower, the grandson of United States President Dwight David Eisenhower, to Julie Nixon, the daughter of President Richard Nixon, in 1968. Fogerty told Rolling Stone:

In 1993, Fogerty confessed to Rolling Stone's Michael Goldberg, "It was written, of course, during the Nixon era, and well, let's say I was very non-supportive of Mr. Nixon."  The song has been widely used to protest military actions and elitism in Western society, particularly in the United States; as an added consequence of its popularity, it has even been used in completely unrelated situations, such as to advertise blue jeans. It attracted criticism when Bruce Springsteen, Dave Grohl, and Zac Brown performed the song together at the November 2014 Concert for Valor in Washington, D.C. Fogerty, a military veteran, defended their song choice.

Fogerty's revulsion with President Nixon can also be found on the album's closing track, "Effigy." In 2013 the singer-songwriter told David Cavanagh of Uncut that the tune was his response to Nixon emerging from the White House one afternoon and sneering at the anti-war demonstrators outside, with Fogerty remembering, "He said, 'Nothing you do here today will have any effect on me. I'm going back inside to watch the football game.

"Don't Look Now" displays Fogerty's concern for the working poor ("Who will take the coal from the mine? Who will take the salt from the earth?").  As recounted in the VH1 Legends episode on the band, Fogerty once stated to Time magazine, "I see things through lower class eyes."

The Chuck Berry-guitar romp "It Came Out of the Sky" tells the tale of a farmer who finds a UFO in his field and unwittingly becomes the most famous man in America. The album also includes two instrumental tracks in "Poorboy Shuffle" and "Side o' the Road", the former of which segues directly into the song "Feelin' Blue."

The album contains two songs associated with blues and folk legend Lead Belly: "Cotton Fields" and "The Midnight Special".  In 2012, Fogerty explained to Uncut, "Lead Belly was a big influence.  I learned about him through Pete Seeger.  When you listen to those guys, you're getting down to the root of the tree."  In 1982, the band's rendition of "Cotton Fields" made #50 on Billboard magazine's Country Singles chart.

When the band members were finalizing the album, they and photographer Basul Parik went over to the intersection of Peralta St. and Hollis St. in  Oakland, California and shot the cover photograph at Duck Kee Market, owned by Ruby Lee.

ReceptionWilly and the Poor Boys was released in November 1969 as Fantasy 8397, and in 1970 made the Top 50 in six countries, including France, where it reached #1.  On December 16, 1970, the Recording Industry Association of America certified the album gold (500,000 units sold). Almost 20 years later, on December 13, 1990, the album was certified platinum (1,000,000 units sold) and 2× platinum (2,000,000 units sold).

The album was well received, exemplified by the original review in Rolling Stone, which stated it was the band's "best one yet". In a contemporary review for The Village Voice, Robert Christgau also believed it was the group's best record and wrote, "Fogerty's subtlety as a political songwriter (have you ever really dug the words of 'Fortunate Son'?) comes as no surprise." He later included it in his "Basic Record Library" of 1950s and 1960s recordings, published in Christgau's Record Guide: Rock Albums of the Seventies (1981).

In a retrospective review, AllMusic editor Stephen Thomas Erlewine called the album "one of the greatest pure rock & roll albums ever cut". He contrasted Willy and the Poor Boys with CCR's previous album, Green River, saying the songs on this album are softer and more upbeat, except for "Effigy". Erlewine went on to state that "Fortunate Son" is not as dated as most of the other protest songs of the era, though he also felt the song was a little out of place on the album, and compared "Poorboy Shuffle" to songs performed by jug bands. In the Blender magazine review of the album, it was called the opposite of Sgt. Pepper's Lonely Hearts Club Band and psychedelic rock, which the reviewer felt was because of the band's performance at the Woodstock Festival. For his Rolling Stone review of the album's 40th anniversary reissue, Barry Walters called it "relaxed" and gave credit to Fogerty for writing a protest song, "Fortunate Son", that has a good beat to it.

In 2003, the album was ranked number 392 on Rolling Stone's list of the 500 greatest albums of all time; the 2012 edition of the list had it ranked number 309, and the 2020 edition of the list included the album at number 193.

The album was remastered and reissued on 180-gram vinyl by Analogue Productions in 2006. On June 10, 2008, it was remastered and released by Concord Music Group as a compact disc, with three bonus tracks.

Track listing

 Sides one and two were combined as tracks 1–10 on CD reissues.

PersonnelPer liner notes''
Creedence Clearwater Revival
John Fogerty – vocals, lead guitar, piano, maracas, cowbell, harmonica , producer, arranger
Tom Fogerty – rhythm guitar, backing vocals
Stu Cook – bass, washtub bass , backing vocals
Doug Clifford – drums, washboard 
Additional musicians
Booker T. Jones – organ 
Steve Cropper – guitar 
Donald "Duck" Dunn – bass 
Al Jackson, Jr. – drums 

Production
Basul Parik – photography
Chris Clough – 2008 compilation producer
Ed Ward – 2008 liner notes
Joel Selvin – 2008 liner notes
Rikka Arnold – project assistance
Bill Belmont – project assistance
Jennifer Peters – project assistance

Charts

See also
Kalamazoo, Michigan

References

External links
 Willy and the Poor Boys at Yahoo! Music
 Willy and the Poor Boys Infosite
 

Creedence Clearwater Revival albums
1969 albums
Fantasy Records albums
Albums produced by John Fogerty